Melissa Boekelman (born 11 May 1989 in Dordrecht) is a Dutch shot putter and bobsledder.
She made her bobsleigh debut in a Europa Cup meeting at Königssee in December 2013, finishing 7th. In January 2014 she made her first appearance at a Bobsleigh World Cup event at St. Moritz, finishing 11th.

Her personal bests in the shot put are 18.36 metres outdoors (Burcht 2016) and 18.02 metres indoors (Apeldoorn 2010).

International competitions

References
 

1989 births
Living people
Sportspeople from Dordrecht
Dutch female shot putters
Dutch female discus throwers
Dutch female bobsledders
Athletes (track and field) at the 2016 Summer Olympics
Olympic athletes of the Netherlands
Dutch Athletics Championships winners
21st-century Dutch women